This is a list of Mexican football transfers in the Mexican Primera División during the winter 2009–10 transfer window, grouped by club. The 2010 transfer window was held from December 13 to January 16. New squad players were registered for Bicentenario 2010. Football has been played professionally in Mexico since the early 1900s. Since 1996, the country has played two split seasons instead of a traditional long season. There are two separate playoff and league divisions. After many years of calling the regular seasons as "Verano" (Summer) and "Invierno" (Winter); the Mexican Primera División (Mexican First League Division) have changed the names of the competition, and has opted for "Apertura" (opening) and "Clausura" (closing) events. The Apertura division begins in the middle of Mexico's summer and ends before the official start of winter. The Clausura division begins during the New Year, and concludes in the spring season.

Mexican Primera División

América

In:

Out:

Atlante

In:

Out:

Atlas

In:

Out:

Chiapas

In:

Out:

Ciudad Juárez

In:

Out:

Cruz Azul

In:

Out:

Guadalajara

In:

Out:

Monterrey

In:

Out:

Morelia

In:

Out:

Pachuca

In:

Out:

Puebla

In:

 

Out:

Querétaro

In:

Out:

San Luis

In:

Out:

Santos Laguna

In:

Out:

Toluca

In:

 

Out:

Tecos

In:

Out:

UANL

In:

 
 

Out:

UNAM

In:

Out:

See also
Primera División de México Bicentenario 2010

References

Tran
Tran
Mexico
Winter 2009-10